Odo V was Count of Troyes and of Meaux, including Vitry-le-François, from 1089 to his death, in 1093. Son of Theobald III and Adele of Valois, he was succeeded by his younger brother, Hugh, Count of Champagne.

References

1093 deaths
Year of birth unknown
House of Blois